Bed of Gold is the debut EP of San Francisco-based indie rock band LoveLikeFire. It was released in 2006, the same year that the band formed. The album received critical praise from The A.V. Club, LA Weekly, and the East Bay Express.

Track listing 
 "Inner Space" – 2:29
 "A Million Pieces" – 4:10
 "Radio Nurse" – 5:03
 "You're Never Alone" – 4:38
 "Bullet Proof" – 3:10
 "Delusion" – 6:07

References 

2006 debut EPs
LoveLikeFire albums